Jasmine Sanders, also known as Golden Barbie, is a German-American model and fashion influencer.

Early life
Sanders was born in 1991 in Frankenthal, Germany to a German mother and African-American father; she was raised in Columbia, South Carolina.

Career

Sanders started her career as a teenager, modeling for Seventeen, Free People, Nike, and ALDO shoes. She made a shift towards high fashion work by walking the runway for Miu Miu's S/S 2016 show. She has also appeared in runway shows for designers including Moschino, Ralph Lauren, DKNY, Jeremy Scott, Julien MacDonald, and Philip Plein.

Sanders has appeared in editorials for American Vogue, Vogue Italia, British Vogue, Vogue Russia, Vogue Arabia, LOVE, Allure, CR Fashion Book, Esquire, Glamour, GQ, Interview and W. Sanders has appeared on numerous magazine covers, including the November 2018 cover of the Turkish edition of Elle Magazine, Harper's Bazaar Kazakhstan, Harper's Bazaar Mexico, InStyle Russia, L'Officiel Switzerland, Lui Magazine, Ocean Drive, Treats!, Wonderland Magazine, and Maxim in late 2019. She has had advertising campaigns for Bvlgari, Roberto Cavalli, MCM, Ralph Lauren, Ugg, Gap, Victoria's Secret PINK, and American Eagle. Sanders has worked with photographers like Steven Klein, Inez & Vinoodh, Cass Bird, Patrick Demarchelier, Glen Luchford, Alasdair McLellan, Ezra Petronio, Sølve Sundsbø, Ellen von Unwerth, and Gilles Bensimon.

Sanders is a muse of makeup artist Pat McGrath. In 2017, Sanders became a spokesmodel for Reebok, and designed her own sneaker which launched in December 2017.

Models.com ranks her as one of the "Sexiest Models". Sanders appeared in the 2019 edition of the Sports Illustrated Swimsuit Issue, and was named Rookie of the Year. She appeared on the cover of the 2020 issue alongside Kate Bock and Olivia Culpo.

Sanders has appeared on NBC's Extra as a special correspondent, as a guest judge on America's Next Top Model and American Beauty Star, and a contestant on VH1's Hip-Hop Squares. In 2015, Sanders appeared on an episode of MTV's Catfish: The TV Show when a woman was using her images under the name "Trinity".

Personal life
In 2010, Sanders dated R&B singer Chris Brown. From 2016 to 2018, she was in a relationship with actor Terrence J. Sanders began a relationship with personal trainer, Anthony Rhoades in April 2021, and the couple have tattoos of each others' names.

Filmography

References 

1991 births
Living people
People from Columbia, South Carolina
German people of African-American descent
American people of German descent
American female models
German female models
African-American female models
Fashion influencers
Female models from South Carolina
People from Frankenthal
The Society Management models
Elite Model Management models
21st-century African-American people
21st-century African-American women